Rovnoye is a village in the Panfilov District of Chüy Region of Kyrgyzstan. Its population was 801 in 2021.

References

Populated places in Chüy Region